Deadman and the Flying Graysons is a 2011 three-issue comic book limited series published by DC Comics for the Flashpoint crossover series. The series features the characters Deadman and the Flying Graysons working at Haly's Circus in an alternative universe from the main DC Comics continuity.

Publication history
The series was written by J.T. Krul, with Mikel Janin doing illustrations for the first issue, but the second and third saw art duties being taken over by Fabrizio Fiorentino. Cliff Chiang served as editor during all three issues.

Plot
Boston Brand (also known as Deadman) is attempting to pull of a trick after his co-workers John, Mary Grayson and their son Dick have done theirs, Brand intentionally outdoes theirs to show off. Afterwards when Dick and his parents help with the packing and cleaning of the circus, but Boston declines to lend a hand, saying that he can not risk tearing his costume, or possibly injure one of his hands, because if he did there would be no show. As the Graysons walk away, they discuss how much of an ego they think Boston has. A while later the Graysons join the resistance against the Atlantean/Amazon war. When the circus gets attacked by Amazons Mary and John are killed, and Boston has to protect Dick.

Reception
The series holds an average rating of 6.3 by 16 professional critics on review aggregation website Comic Book Roundup.

Prints

Issues

Collected editions

See also
 List of DC Comics publications
 List of Batman comics

References

Batman spin-off titles
Dick Grayson
DC Comics limited series